Maurice Harold Friedman (October 27, 1903 – March 8, 1991) was an American physician and reproductive-physiology researcher. He is known for the development of the rabbit test, a pregnancy test developed in 1931 while he was teaching at the Perelman School of Medicine at the University of Pennsylvania.

Biography
Friedman was born on October 27, 1903 in Gary, Indiana, United States. Aged 16, he entered the University of Chicago and was awarded a bachelor's degree and doctorates, both in physiology and medicine. From 1928, he taught at the University of Pennsylvania in physiology. He moved to Washington in 1936 and joined the Georgetown University Hospital and held roles at the Georgetown University School of Medicine and the Washington Hospital Center. He gained employment at the Henry A. Wallace Beltsville Agricultural Research Center, where he continued with his research in reproductive physiology. He retired from medical work in 1959 and joined the Planned Parenthood, Children's House and the Social Hygiene Society, where he worked as a financial advisor.

Friedman died of cancer after a long illness on March 8, 1991 at his home in Sarasota, Florida.

Selected publications

References

1903 births
1991 deaths
People from Gary, Indiana
University of Chicago alumni
University of Pennsylvania faculty
Georgetown University Medical Center faculty
Financial advisors
American physiologists